Petr Garabík (born 1 January 1970) is a Czech former biathlete. He competed at the 1994 Winter Olympics, the 1998 Winter Olympics and the 2002 Winter Olympics.

References

External links
 

1970 births
Living people
Czech male biathletes
Olympic biathletes of the Czech Republic
Biathletes at the 1994 Winter Olympics
Biathletes at the 1998 Winter Olympics
Biathletes at the 2002 Winter Olympics
People from Jeseník
Sportspeople from the Olomouc Region